The 1925 Providence Steam Roller season was their inaugural season in the National Football League. The team finished with a 6–5–1 record against NFL teams, finishing tenth in the league.

Schedule

Game in italics is against a non-NFL team.

Standings

References

Providence Steam Roller seasons
Providence Steam Roller